Todd Lynn (March 19, 1964 – January 27, 2012) was an American stand-up comedian and actor.

Career
Lynn performed in comedy clubs across the U.S.  In 2002, he appeared as a panelist on the Comedy Central show, Tough Crowd with Colin Quinn.  He also had his own Comedy Central Presents special, in 2005.  Lynn performed on Late Night with Conan O'Brien, Jimmy Kimmel Live!, and Late Show with David Letterman.  Additionally, he had a recurring role on the sitcom, My Wife and Kids.

Personal life
Lynn had a bachelor's degree in communications from Central State University, and a master's degree in communications from Xavier University.  Lynn struggled with numerous health problems throughout his life. He had a disfigured left arm and suffered from pancreatic cancer. He also began to go blind due to diabetes, and in the year prior to his death he battled heart and kidney failure. On January 27, 2012, Lynn suffered two strokes and a heart attack, and died in Mississippi.

References

External links
 
 "Todd Lynn" Comedy Central

2012 deaths
American stand-up comedians
1964 births
Place of birth missing
Central State University alumni
Xavier University alumni
21st-century American comedians